Carlos Espínola Zapattini (born 22 May 1995) is an Argentine professional footballer who plays as a midfielder.

Career
Espínola began his career in Primera B Nacional with Los Andes. Having been promoted to their senior squad towards the end of the 2016 campaign, Espínola participated in the club's final four fixtures of the season against Villa Dálmine, Ferro Carril Oeste, Instituto and Nueva Chicago as Los Andes finished bottom of the table. Ten appearances later, versus Almagro on 11 February 2018, he scored his opening goal in a 1–1 draw. In June 2020, Espínola was released following the expiration of his contract.

Career statistics
.

References

External links

1995 births
Living people
Footballers from Buenos Aires
Argentine footballers
Association football midfielders
Primera Nacional players
Primera B Metropolitana players
Club Atlético Los Andes footballers